The Ministry of Finance (MOF) is the government ministry responsible for the finances of the state of Vietnam, including managing the national budget, tax revenue, state assets, national financial reserves and the finances of state corporations.  The Ministry manages the work of national accounting, state borrowing, the activities of stock markets, and the Department of Customs.  Ministry main offices are located in Hanoi.

The Ministry of Finance directly owns and controls some state companies, such as Bao Viet Insurance, of which it owns 71%.

Ministers 
 Phạm Văn Đồng (September 1945 - March 1946)
 Lê Văn Hiến (March 1946 - June 1958)
 Hoàng Anh (June 1958 - April 1965)
 Đặng Việt Châu (April 1965 - March 1974)
 Đào Thiện Thi (March 1974 - 1975) (acting)
 Đào Thiện Thi (1975 - February 1977)
 Hoàng Anh (February 1977 - April 1982)
 Chu Tam Thức (April 1982 - June 1986)
 Vũ Tuân (June 1986 - February 1987)
 Hoàng Quy (February 1987 - May 1992)
 Hồ Tế (May 1992 - November 1996)
 Nguyễn Sinh Hùng (November 1996 - June 2006)
 Vũ Văn Ninh (June 2006 - August 2011)
 Vương Đình Huệ (August 2011 - February 2013)
 Đinh Tiến Dũng (May 2013 - April 2021)
 Hồ Đức Phớc (April 2021 -)

Ministerial units
 Department of State Budget
 Department of Investment
 Department of Finance for National Defence and Security
 Department of Public Expenditure
 Department of Tax Policy
 Department of Banking and Financial Institutions
 Department of Accounting and Auditing Regulations
 Department of Planning and Finance
 Department of Emulation and Reward
 Department of Organisation and Personnel
 Department of International Cooperation
 Department of Legislation
 Office of the Ministry
 Ministry Inspectorate
 General Department of Taxation
 General Department of Customs
 General Department of National Reserves
 State Treasury
 State Securities Commission
 Agency for Public Asset Management
 Agency for Price Management
 Agency for Corporate Finance
 Agency for Financial Informatics and Statistics
 Agency for Debt Management and External Finance
 Agency for Insurance Supervisory and Management

Administrative units
 National Institute for Finance (Institute of Financial Strategy and Policy)
 Vietnam Financial Times
 Finance Magazine
 Training Centre for Finance Officers
 Academy of Finance
 University of Finance and Marketing
 College of Accounting and Finance
 College of Finance and Business Administration
 College of Finance and Customs
 Finance Publishing House

See also
 Government of Vietnam
 Economy of Vietnam
 Ministry of Planning and Investment, Vietnam

References

External links
 Ministry of Finance

Finance
Finance in Vietnam
Vietnam
Governmental office in Hanoi
1945 establishments in Vietnam